{{Speciesbox
| name = Ant-eating chat
| image = Southern Anteater-Chat.jpg
| image_caption = Male
| image2 = Ant-eating chat (Myrmecocichla formicivora) female.jpg
| image2_caption = FemaleTswalu Kalahari Reserve, South Africa
| status = LC
| status_system = IUCN3.1
| status_ref = 
| genus = Myrmecocichla
| species = formicivora
| authority = (Wilkes, 1817)
| synonyms = 
}}

The ant-eating chat or southern anteater-chat (Myrmecocichla formicivora'') is a species of bird in the family Muscicapidae.
It is found in Botswana, Eswatini, Lesotho, Namibia, South Africa, and Zimbabwe.
Its natural habitats are subtropical or tropical dry shrubland and subtropical or tropical dry lowland grassland.

Description 
The species is sexually dimorphic with the male is almost entirely black while the female is brown with a grey bill and legs.

References

External links
 Ant-eating chat - Species text in The Atlas of Southern African Birds.

ant-eating chat
Birds of Southern Africa
ant-eating chat
Taxonomy articles created by Polbot